The Inevitable Rise and Liberation of NiggyTardust! is the third solo studio album by Saul Williams. It was released in 2007. It peaked at number 41 on the Billboard Heatseekers Albums chart, as well as number 89 on the Top R&B/Hip-Hop Albums chart. The album is entirely produced by Trent Reznor. The title of the album is a reference to David Bowie's 1972 album The Rise and Fall of Ziggy Stardust and the Spiders from Mars.

Release
The album was available for purchase or free download at NiggyTardust.com. The website allowed users to pay $5 to support the artist and be given the choice of downloading a 192kbit/s MP3 version, 320kbit/s MP3 version or lossless FLAC version. Digital distribution of the album is provided by Musicane. Reznor publicised the album on the Nine Inch Nails website and mailing list, saying that "Saul's not the household name that Radiohead is" and urging fans to support him. This was a reference to Radiohead's In Rainbows, which was released in October on the band's own website with customers choosing how much they want to pay for the album. The free option has since been removed, with a message on the website claiming their intention had always been to remove it after 100,000 free downloads of the album.

It was announced at nin.com that, as of January 2, 2008, two months since its release, 154,449 people had downloaded NiggyTardust. Of that number, 28,322 people chose to pay the asked price of US$5 (US$141,610 Total). In comparison, Saul's self-titled album has sold 30,000 copies since its release in 2004.

A physical release of the album was released on July 8, 2008. It contained five bonus tracks.

Critical reception

Thom Jurek of AllMusic gave the album 4.5 stars out of 5, saying: "This is Williams' finest moment, and interestingly, one of Reznor's, too."

Quentin B. Huff of PopMatters placed it at number 12 on the "101 Hip-Hop Albums of 2007" list.

Track listing

Personnel
Credits adapted from liner notes.

Musicians
 Saul Williams – vocals, programming
 Trent Reznor – production, programming, backing vocals (5, 8)
 Atticus Ross – additional programming
 Thavius Beck – production (1, 7), programming (1, 7)
 CX KiDTRONiK – production, programming, backing vocals (1, 6)
 Isaiah "Ikey" Owens – keyboards (7)
 Xuly Azaro – backing vocals (9)
 Maryam Nalo Blacksher – viola (13)
 Gingger Shankar – double violin (13)
 Persia White – backing vocals (11)
 Alan Moulder – mixing
 Brian Gardner – mastering

Technical personnel
 Angelbert Metoyer – artwork
 Melody Ehsani – cover art, jewelry design
 Rob Sheridan – graphic design, layout

Charts

References

External links
 
 
 

2007 albums
Albums free for download by copyright owner
Saul Williams albums
Albums produced by Trent Reznor